Jaynagar Institution (abbreviated as JI) is a government-sponsored high school in the Jaynagar Majilpur of the South 24 Parganas district in the Indian state of West Bengal. This is a boys' only school for the secondary and higher secondary level students. Its medium of instruction is Bengali. The institution played a key role during Bengal Renaissance period. It was once considered one of the best Bengali medium schools in the Greater Kolkata and continues to be a good one. The campus includes a fairly large play-ground and the school offers variety of extracurricular activities for its students. The school has produced many well known academics, film and theater personalities, journalist and musicians.

Geography

History
It is one of the oldest schools in the whole country.

Affiliations
The school is affiliated to the West Bengal Board of Secondary Education for secondary level students, and to the West Bengal Council of Higher Secondary Education for higher secondary level students.

References

Day schools
Schools in Colonial India
Government schools in India
Boys' schools in India
High schools and secondary schools in West Bengal
Schools in South 24 Parganas district
Education in Jaynagar Majilpur
Academic institutions associated with the Bengal Renaissance
Educational institutions established in 1878
1878 establishments in British India